Events of 2014 in Spain

Incumbents
Monarch: Juan Carlos I (abdicated 19 June), Felipe VI 
Prime Minister: Mariano Rajoy

Events

January

 3 January - the 75th anniversary of the Agencia EFE.
7 January - The infanta Cristina of Spain is charged by the judge hearing the Nóos case, with money laundering and tax crimes.
 11 January – About 110,000 people march peacefully through Bilbao, demanding Basque independence and freedom for more than 600 ETA prisoners.

February
 20 February - 20: Statements made by actor Javier Bardem in Paris during the presentation of a documentary produced by him on the human rights situation in Western Sahara causes a diplomatic row between France and Morocco.

March
 11 March - the 10th anniversary of the 2004 Madrid train bombings
 22 March – 101 people are injured and 29 arrested after an anti-austerity march turns violent in Madrid.

June
 2 June – King Juan Carlos announces his intention to abdicate, after nearly 39 years on the throne. His son Felipe, Prince of Asturias, is to succeed him. The announcement of the pending abdication is followed by large anti-monarchy demonstrations in Madrid and Barcelona.
 19 June - King Juan Carlos I abdicates in favour of his son, King Felipe VI.  Felipe is enthroned at the Congress building in Madrid, in a ceremony that does not include coronation.  He then travels with his family to the Royal Palace in a Rolls-Royce and appears on the balcony to wave to crowds.
 21 June - many events are seen around each of the 17 regional parliaments against economic cuts, which are a result of the crisis afflicting the country since 2008.

July
 9 July - France denies having amended its penal policy by moving 2 ETA convicts to the prison in Mont-de-Marsan; closest to the Basque Country, which was their main region of operation.

November
 9 November - The Catalan people vote in a referendum on whether and how they should exercise self-determination. The unionist government in Madrid does not recognise the authority of the vote.
 18 November - UNESCO declares the Camino de Santiago of Spain as a World Heritage Site in Danger.

Deaths
1 February – Luis Aragonés, 75, footballer and manager 
25 February – Paco de Lucía, 66, flamenco composer, guitarist and producer
23 March - Adolfo Suárez, 81, 138th Prime Minister of Spain

See also
2014 in Spanish television
List of Spanish films of 2014

References

 
2010s in Spain
Years of the 21st century in Spain
Spain
Spain